is a city in Akita Prefecture, Japan. , the city had an estimated population of 81,133 in 31,457 households, and a population density of 94 persons per km².

Geography
Daisen is located in the flatlands of central Akita Prefecture, bordering the city of Akita to the west and Iwate Prefecture and the Ōu Mountains on the east. The area of the city is greater than the total metropolitan area of Tokyo.

Neighboring municipalities
Akita Prefecture
Akita
Yurihonjō
Yokote
Semboku
Misato
Iwate Prefecture
Nishiwaga

Climate
Daisen has a humid continental climate (Köppen climate classification Dfa / Cfa) with large seasonal temperature differences, with warm to hot (and often humid) summers and cold (sometimes severely cold) winters. Precipitation is significant throughout the year but is heaviest from August to October.

Demographics
Per Japanese census data, the population of Daisen peaked at around the year 1960 and has been in steady decline since then.

History
The area of present-day Daisen was part of ancient Dewa Province. During the Edo period, the area came under the control of the Satake clan, who had been relocated to Kubota Domain from their former holdings in Hitachi Province. After the start of the Meiji period, and the establishment of the modern municipalities system,  the area became part of Semboku District, Akita Prefecture in 1878.

The city of Daisen was established on March 22, 2005, from the merger of the city of Ōmagari, the towns of Kamioka, Kyōwa, Nakasen, Nishisenboku, Ōta and Semboku, and the village of Nangai (all from Semboku District).

Government
After the merger, Daisen had the distinction of having the largest city assembly in all of Japan, 145 members.
The city now has a mayor-council form of government with a directly elected mayor and a unicameral city legislature of 28 members. The city contributes five members to the Akita Prefectural Assembly.  In terms of national politics, the city is part of Akita District 3 of the lower house of the Diet of Japan.

Economy
The economy of Daisen is based on agriculture and the area is noted for its rice production. Numerous sake brewers are located in Daisen.

Education
Daisen has 16 public elementary schools and 11 public middle schools operated by the city government and five public high schools operated by the Akita Prefectural Board of Education. There is also one private high school. The prefecture also operates one special education school for the handicapped.

Transportation

Railways
 East Japan Railway Company - Akita Shinkansen
 
 East Japan Railway Company - Ōu Main Line
  -   -  -  - 
 East Japan Railway Company - Tazawako Line
  -   -  -  -  -

Highways

Sister city relations
  Tettnang, Germany
  Dangjin, Chungcheongnam-do, Korea

Media
FM Hanabi

Local attractions
Former Ikeda Family Gardens, National Historic Site
Hotta Fort, National Historic Site

Notable people from Daisen 
Eiji Gotō, admiral in the Imperial Japanese Navy
Gotō Chūgai, writer
Kazuo Koike, manga writer
Nobuhide Minorikawa, politician
Kazuo Oga
Hitoshi Okuda, Manga artist
Toshirō Yanagiba, actor
Ryōgoku Yūjirō, sumo wrestler
Sukeshiro Terata, politician

References

External links

Official Website 

 
Cities in Akita Prefecture